La Diablesse or Ladjablès is a character in Caribbean folklore. The legend says that she was born as a human, but her vanity leads her to make deals with the devil, giving him her soul for eternal youth, thereby being transformed into a demon.

To others, her poise, figure, and dress make her seem beautiful. However, her hideous face is hidden by a large brimmed hat, and her long dress hides the fact that one leg ends in a cow hoof. She walks with one foot on the road and her cow hoof in the grass at the side of the road. She smells distinctly of a mix of fine perfume and deadly decay. 

She can cast spells on her unsuspecting male victim, whom she leads into the forest. When in the forest, she disappears. The victim, confused, lost, and scared, run around the forest until he falls into a ravine or river, or gets eaten by a wild dog and dies.

To break the spell of La Diablesse, one must turn their clothing inside out and walk home backward, away from the area she was spotted in.

In popular culture
 La Diablesse is also mentioned in The Jumbies by Tracey Baptiste.
 La Diablesse is referred by Derek Walcott in his play Dream on Monkey Mountain.
 La Diablesse is mentioned repeatedly in the book series Dungeon Crawler Carl as the class chosen by Lucia Marr
 Junot Díaz refers to La Diablesse in the nickname La Jablesse for Jenni Muñóz in “The Brief Wondrous Life of Oscar Wao”(2007].

See also
Duppy
Mami Wata
Madam Koi Koi

References

External links
 Grenadien Folklore Characters

Caribbean legendary creatures
Grenadian culture